Kilmeny of the Orchard is a novel by Lucy Maud Montgomery.

Plot
A young man named Eric Marshall goes to teach a school on Prince Edward Island and meets Kilmeny, a mute girl who has perfect hearing.  He sees her when he is walking through an old orchard and hears her playing the violin. He visits her a number of times and gradually falls in love with her. When he proposes she rejects him, even though she loves him in return, believing that her disability will only hinder his life if they were married, despite his protests that it wouldn't matter at all. 

Meanwhile, Eric's good friend David who is a renowned throat doctor, comes to the island and visits Eric. He examines Kilmeny, and says that nothing will cure her but an extreme psychological need to speak.

Characters 
 Eric Marshall: The male protagonist in the story.  He is described as "one of those men regarding whom less-favoured mortals are tempted to wonder why all the gifts of fortune should be showered on one individual". His one fault seems to be extreme pragmatism. Eric lost his mother when he was ten, and has high ideals regarding a future wife.

 Kilmeny Gordon: Kilmeny is the main female protagonist, a sheltered, beautiful girl. Unfortunately, Kilmeny is mute, and expresses herself with the help of a slate and pencil, or her treasured violin.

 David Baker: Eric's older friend who owes David's father a debt of gratitude. He works as a throat specialist. David is very close to Eric and wishes he would get married.

 Larry West: A poor, hardworking student who used to go to school with Eric. He offers Eric a position as a teacher at a school in Lindsay, on PEI.

 Mr. Marshall, Sr.: Eric's father a "keen, shrewd, somewhat hard, although just and honest, man of business". He, like David, wishes Eric would marry.

 Mrs. Williamson: A quiet, motherly, country woman who is Eric's land-lady. Larry describes her as She-Who-Must-Be-Obeyed.

 Old Robert Williamson: Mrs. Williamson's husband, a talkative, gossipy man.

 Thomas Gordon: Kilmeny's uncle, who helped raise her after her mother's death three years back. He is well-read, and wins any argument he enters, although he becomes embarrassed for days after.

 Janet Gordon: Kilmeny's aunt, who helped raise her after her mother's death three years back. An intelligent woman. she stays in the woman's sphere, but enjoys seeing her brother bested.

 Margaret Gordon: Kilmeny's dead mother, whose stubbornness and influence last past the grave.

 Neil Gordon: An Italian who was orphaned as a baby, Neil spent his life as an outsider. He was raised by the Gordons, and loves Kilmeny.

References

External links 
 
 KILMENY OF THE ORCHARD on-line text of BUILD-A-BOOK Initiative
 L.M. Montgomery Online Formerly the L.M. Montgomery Research Group, this site includes a blog, extensive lists of primary and secondary materials, detailed information about Montgomery's publishing history, and a filmography of screen adaptations of Montgomery texts. See, in particular, the page about Kilmeny of the Orchard.
 L.M. Montgomery's Personal Scrapbooks and Book Covers
 Kilmeny of the Orchard An L. M. Montgomery Resource Page
 The L.M. Montgomery Literary Society This site includes information about Montgomery's works and life and research from the newsletter, The Shining Scroll. Learn more about the original version of Kilmeny, called Una of the Garden, on our Items of Interest Related to LMM page.
 

1910 Canadian novels
New Canadian Library
Novels by Lucy Maud Montgomery
Canadian romance novels
Novels set in Prince Edward Island